Jone Jone Jat Jat is a 2017 Burmese romantic comedy-horror film, directed by Ko Zaw (Ar Yone Oo) starring Sai Sai Kham Leng, Wutt Hmone Shwe Yi, Soe Myat Thuzar and Nay Dway. The film, produced by Shwe Si Taw Film Production premiered in Myanmar on April 7, 2017.

Cast
Sai Sai Kham Leng as Lu Sein Thit
Wutt Hmone Shwe Yi as Ngwe Yatu
Soe Myat Thuzar as Ghost Leader, Daw Thuzar
Nay Dway as Shine Aye Ko

References

2017 films
2010s Burmese-language films
Burmese romantic comedy films
Films shot in Myanmar
Burmese horror films